Potthastia is a genus of non-biting midges in the subfamily Diamesinae of the bloodworm family Chironomidae.

Species
The genus includes the following species:

 P. gaedii (Meigen, 1838)
 P. iberica Serra-tosio, 1971
 P. longimana Kieffer, 1922
 P. montium (Edwards, 1929)
 P. pastoris (Edwards, 1933)

External links
 

Chironomidae
Diptera of Europe